The Dubai Mixed-Use Towers, also referred to as the Dancing Sisters (and nicknamed the Spice Girls in reference to both Dubai’s role in the spice trade and the musicality of the design) are consist of 53 storey hotel tower and a 61 storey residential tower located adjacent to Burj Khalifa in Downtown Dubai, Dubai, United Arab Emirates.

See also
List of tallest buildings in Dubai
List of tallest buildings in the United Arab Emirates

References

External links
 Constructionweekonline.com
 Fentressarchitects.com

Mixed-use developments in the United Arab Emirates
Skyscraper hotels in Dubai
Residential skyscrapers in Dubai